Bayne may refer to:

 Bayne (surname), a list of people
 Bayne Norrie (born 1944), Canadian football player
 Bayne, Lincoln County, Kansas, a former settlement
 Bayne, Russell County, Kansas, a former settlement
 Bayne, Washington, an unincorporated community

See also
 Rural Municipality of Bayne No. 371, Saskatchewan, a rural municipality in Canada
 Bayne House (disambiguation)
 Bain (disambiguation)